Get Into It is the first album by rapper Cazwell. The album can also be seen as an extended play or mini-album, since it consists of seven original songs and eight remixes. Copies bought from his official website could also be autographed by him if the purchaser chose.

To celebrate the release, Clubplanet threw a release party. Cazwell celebrated the release of the album with a live performance featuring Avenue D and Amanda Lepore who also contributed to the album.

Track listing
"I Buy My Socks on 14th Street" (3:29)
"Watch My Mouth" (3:05)
"The Sex That I Need" (feat. Avenue D) (3:46)
"All Over Your Face" (5:16)
"Do You Wanna Break Up" (2:51)
"Getting' Over" (3:51)
"Get Into It" (feat. Amanda Lepore) 3:59
"I Buy My Socks On 14th Street" (Old School Mix) (3:23)
"All Over Your Face" (Extended Disco Vocal Mix) (5:16)
"All Over Your Face" (Funky Junction & Antony Reale Subliminal Reprise Twisted Dub Mix) (7:31)
"All Over Your Face" (Gomi's West 22nd Street Mix) (5:54)
"All Over Your Face" (Craig C. Club Mix) (7:30)
"Watch My Mouth" (Instrumental) (3:06)
"The Sex That I Need" (Instrumental) (3:49)
"All Over Your Face" (Extended Disco Instrumental) (5:19)

References

Amazon.com listing

2006 albums
Cazwell albums